Neon Noon is a book by Tanuj Solanki which was published on July 10, 2016 by HarperCollins.

Critical reception and reviews 
Business Line wrote "Tanuj Solanki’s debut is a smart, wryly funny book about love and loss in yuppie-land", Henna Rakheja of Hindustan Times wrote "This compact novel by Tanuj Solanki appears to be a jigsaw puzzle in the beginning. In the author’s own words: A short story can be a sprawling mess too.", Supriya Sharma wrote "Tanuj Solanki’s debut novel is an account of coming to terms with one of the oldest afflictions known to humankind – heartbreak" and Neha Bhatt of Scroll.in wrote "Tanuj Solanki’s debut ‘Neon Noon’ is enigmatic, moody, ingenious – and strangely gripping".

The book has been also reviewed by Manik Sharma of Firstpost.

The book was longlisted for Tata Literature Live! First Book Award in Fiction category.

References 

2016 books